Bad Ronald is a 1974 American made-for-television horror thriller film directed by Buzz Kulik and starring Scott Jacoby, Pippa Scott, John Larch, Dabney Coleman and Kim Hunter. It is based on the novel of the same title by Jack Vance.

Plot
Ronald Wilby (Scott Jacoby) is a socially inept, awkward high school youth with budding artistic talent and a predilection for fantasy, who is often ridiculed for his behavior and mannerisms. His overprotective mother, Elaine (Kim Hunter), needs surgery and plans for Ronald to become a doctor and cure her illness. Ronald's father has not been heard from in years, having divorced his mother and agreeing to terminate his parental rights in exchange for not having to pay child support.

One afternoon, while asking out Laurie Matthews (Shelley Spurlock), Ronald is rejected and then ridiculed by her friends. As he returns home, he accidentally knocks over her younger sister Carol (Angela Hoffman). Carol, like Laurie, taunts Ronald. He pushes her over, inadvertently killing her when she strikes her head on a concrete block. He buries the body and confesses to his mother. Fearing the police will not believe that it was accidental, Ronald and his mother wallpaper the door frame to the downstairs bathroom and convert the closed-off space to a living quarters for Ronald, with a concealed trapdoor in the pantry through which Ronald can escape in an emergency. The plan is for him to hide in the room until the incident blows over. Mrs. Wilby tells the police that Ronald ran away.

Ronald's mother pays attention to what neighbors, particularly the nosy Mrs. Schumacher (Linda Watkins), and others are saying about the girl's disappearance and tells Ronald that when it's safe, he can return to a normal life. One afternoon, she is taken into a hospital for gallbladder surgery, from which she unexpectedly dies. In the meantime, Ronald has created a fantasy world in his head consisting of a prince and a princess that live happily until an evil duke appears and a struggle begins.

Shortly after Mrs. Wilby's death, the house is sold to the Wood family, consisting of a mother (Pippa Scott), father (Dabney Coleman) and three teenage daughters: Babs (Cindy Fisher), Althea (Cindy Eilbacher) and Ellen (Lisa Eilbacher). 
As Ronald needs food and begins to crave human interaction, disappearances of food and odd noises are experienced by the new family.

Babs, the youngest of the Wood daughters, becomes identified with Ronald's princess and he identifies himself as the prince. Duane Matthews (Ted Eccles) (who is well liked by the family), oldest daughter Ellen's boyfriend and brother of the Matthews girls, becomes identified with the evil duke that threatens their happiness. Ronald's goal is to "regain" his princess and remove anything, including the members of her family, that stops his dream from becoming reality. During this time, neighbor Mrs. Schumacher sees Ronald and dies of a heart attack from the shock; fearing the police will blame him, Ronald buries her too.

Mr. and Mrs. Wood make plans to go out of town for a couple of days, leaving the girls on their own. Ronald confronts Babs when she is alone in the house and tells her she is his princess. She flees to Mrs. Schumacher's house next door (unaware of her demise), but Ronald locks her in the basement and forges a note for her sisters to find, claiming she has run away. Both Ellen and Althea are skeptical of the note, but the police refuse to do anything. Ronald later attacks Duane when he is alone in the house. He knocks him out, binds and gags him, and hides him in his hidden living space. The police now suspect something is wrong and advise Ellen and Althea to check into a hotel; they refuse.

Shortly after the police leave, the girls hear noises downstairs as Duane tries to free himself and fights with Ronald. Althea notices one of the many peepholes Ronald has drilled. When she approaches it, she sees Ronald's eye staring back at her and screams in terror as Ronald breaks through the wall. The police, who have been watching the house, hear the screams and rush back. Ronald is captured as he tries to flee, crying out for his mother. Babs is found after escaping from Mrs. Schumacher's basement, and Duane is found in the living space, both shaken but not seriously harmed.

Cast
 Scott Jacoby as Ronald Wilby
 Pippa Scott as Mrs. Wood
 John Larch as Sgt. Lynch
 Dabney Coleman as Mr. Wood
 Kim Hunter as Elaine Wilby
 John Fiedler as Mr. Roscoe
 Linda Watkins as Mrs. Schumacher
 Cindy Fisher as Babs Wood 
 Cindy Eilbacher as Althea Wood
 Lisa Eilbacher as Ellen Wood
 Ted Eccles as Duane Matthews
 Roger Aaron Brown as Sergeant Carter 
 Aneta Corsaut as Mrs. Matthews 
 Angela Hoffman as Carol Matthews 
 Karen Purcill as Wanda (as Karen Purcil)
 Shelley Spurlock as Laurie Matthews
 Lesley Woods as Aunt Margaret

Reception
In his book What Were They Thinking? The 100 Dumbest Events in Television History, author David Hofstede ranked the movie at #90 on the list.

Home media
The film was released on VHS in the 1980s and reissued on DVD in August 2009, as part of the manufacture-on-demand Warner Archive Collection.  It was later released on Blu-ray on October 9, 2018.

See also
 List of American films of 1974
 List of horror films of 1974
 The Boy, also featuring a troubled boy who murders a young girl and is then hidden by parents in the walls of his house.

References

External links

 

1970s psychological thriller films
1974 television films
1974 films
1974 horror films
American horror television films
Films directed by Buzz Kulik
Films scored by Fred Karlin
Films based on American novels
ABC Movie of the Week
1970s American films